Border control is generally the responsibility of specialised government organisations which oversee various aspects their jurisdiction's border control policies, including customs, immigration policy, border security, biosecurity measures. Official designations, division of responsibilities, and command structures of these organisations vary considerably and some countries split border control functions across multiple agencies.

Canada
 Immigration, Refugees and Citizenship Canada: Immigration, Refugees and Citizenship Canada (IRCC) is the department of the Government of Canada with responsibility for matters dealing with immigration to Canada, refugees, and Canadian citizenship. IRCC's mandate emanates from the Department of Citizenship and Immigration Act. The Minister of IRCC is the key person to uphold and administer the Citizenship Act of 197 and its subsequent amendments. The minister will work closely with the Minister of Public Safety in relation to the administration of the Immigration and Refugee Protection Act.
 Canada Border Services Agency: The Canada Border Services Agency (CBSA) is the primary organisation tasked with maintaining Canada's border controls. The Agency was created on 12 December 2003, though its creation was formalised by the Canada Border Services Agency Act, which received Royal Assent on 3 November 2005. amalgamating Canada Customs (from the now-defunct Canada Customs and Revenue Agency) with border and enforcement personnel from the Department of the CIC and the Canadian Food Inspection Agency (CFIA).
 Canadian Air Transport Security Authority: The Canadian Air Transport Security Authority (CATSA; is the Canadian Crown corporation responsible for security screening of people and baggage and the administration of identity cards at the 89 designated airports in Canada. CATSA is answerable to Transport Canada and reports to the Government of Canada through the Minister of Transport.

China
Border control in China is the responsibility of a variety of entities in each of the country's four distinct immigration areas. In the Special Administrative Regions of Hong Kong and Macau, agencies tracing their lineage to British and Portuguese colonial authorities, respectively, perform border control functions based on the policies and practices in force before those territories' return to the People's Republic of China. Areas administered by the Republic of China are subject to border controls distinct from those in the People's Republic of China.
  People's Republic of China:
 : The Immigration Department of Hong Kong is responsible for border controls of the Hong Kong Special Administrative Regions, including internal controls with the rest of China. After the People's Republic of China resumed sovereignty of the territory in July 1997, Hong Kong's immigration system remained largely unchanged from its British predecessor model. In addition, visa-free entry acceptance regulations into Hong Kong for passport holders of some 170 countries remain unchanged before and after 1997.
 : The Immigration Department of Macau, under the Public Security Police Force, is the government agency responsible for immigration matters, whilst the Public Security Police Force itself is responsible for enforcing immigration laws in Macau.
  Mainland China: Border control in Mainland China is the responsibility of National Immigration Administration (NIA)), a unit of the Ministry of Public Security (MPS). Customs related border controls are largely within the purview of the General Administration of Customs of the People's Republic of China.

India
Border control in India is performed by a variety of organisations, each focusing on a distinct section of its external borders.
 Border Security Force: The Border Security Force, or BSF, is the primary border defence organisation of India. It is one of the five Central Armed Police Forces of the Union of India, it was raised in the wake of the 1965 War on 1 December 1965, "for ensuring the security of the borders of India and for matters connected there with". From independence in 1947 to 1965, the protection of India's international boundaries was the responsibility of local police belonging to each border state, with little inter-state coordination. BSF was created as a Central government-controlled security force to guard all of India's borders, thus bringing greater cohesion in border security. BSF is charged with guarding India's land border during peacetime and preventing transnational crime. It is a Union Government Agency under the administrative control of the Ministry of Home Affairs. It currently stands as the world's largest border guarding force.
 Assam Rifles: The Assam Rifles, one of India's oldest continuously existent paramilitary units, has been responsible for physical controls on the border between India and Myanmar since 2002. The border area between India, Myanmar, and China is largely made up of minority groups, many of which are transboundary communities. Consequently, enforcing border controls is a challenge for all three countries, and porous sections of the border between India and Myanmar have historically been common since Myanmar was formerly a part of the British Indian Empire.
 Indo–Tibetan Border Police: The Indo-Tibetan Border Police (ITBP) is charged with maintaining border controls on India's side of the extensive border between minority regions of India and China. In September 1996, the Parliament of India enacted the "Indo-Tibetan Border Police Force Act, 1992" to "provide for the constitution and regulation" of the ITBP "for ensuring the security of the borders of India and for matters connected therewith". The first head of the ITBP, designated Inspector General, was Balbir Singh, a police officer previously belonging to the Intelligence Bureau. The ITBP, which started with 4 battalions, has since restructuring in 1978, undergone expansion to a force of 56 battalions as of 2017 with a sanctioned strength of 89,432.

Indonesia
The Directorate General of Immigration (Indonesian: Direktorat Jenderal Imigrasi) is the primary agency tasked with border control in Indonesia.

Ireland
Border control for the Republic of Ireland is managed at major ports and airports by Border Management Unit, directed by the Department of Justice and Equality's Irish Naturalisation and Immigration Service. The Garda National Immigration Bureau manages VISA and residency requirements. The Revenue Commissioners control customs and excise. As the Republic maintains a common travel area with the United Kingdom, there is no formal border control on the Northern Irish border.

Iran
 Iranian Immigration & Passport Police: The Immigration & Passport Police Office is a subdivision of Law Enforcement Force of Islamic Republic of Iran with the authority to issue Iranian passports and deals with Immigrants to Iran. The agency is member of ICAO's Public Key Directory (PKD).
 Islamic Republic of Iran Border Guard Command: Islamic Republic of Iran Border Guard Command, commonly known as NAJA Border Guard, is a subdivision of Law Enforcement Force of Islamic Republic of Iran (NAJA) and Iran's sole agency that performs border guard and control in land borders, and coast guard in maritime borders. The unit was founded in 2000, and from 1991 to 2000, the unit's duties was done by of Security deputy of NAJA. Before 1991, border control was Gendarmerie's duty.

Malaysia
The Immigration Department of Malaysia is a department of the Federal Government of Malaysia which provides services to Malaysian Citizens, Permanent Residents and Foreign Visitors.

The functions of the department are as follows:
Issuing of passports and travel documents to Malaysian Citizens and Permanent Residents.
Issuing of visas, passes and permits to Foreign Nationals entering Malaysia.
Administering and managing the movement of people at authorised entry and exit points.
Enforcing the Immigration Act 1959/63, Immigration Regulations 1963 and Passport Act 1966.

North Korea
Border Security Command and Coastal Security Bureau are collectively responsible for restricting unauthorised cross-border (land and sea) entries and exits, in the early 1990s the bureaux responsible for border security and coastal security were transferred from the State Security Department to the Ministry of People's Armed Forces. Sometime thereafter, the Border Security Bureau was enlarged to corps level and renamed the Border Security Command. Previously headquartered in Chagang Province, the Border Security Command was relocated to Pyongyang in 2002.

Pakistan
Physical controls on Pakistan's international borders are managed by dedicated paramilitary units: the Pakistan Rangers on the border with India, the Frontier Corps with Afghanistan and Iran and the Gilgit−Baltistan Scouts with China and the Pakistan-administered side of the Line of Control.
 The Pakistan Rangers are two paramilitary law enforcement organisations whose primary mission is border defence on the border with India as well as internal security operations, and providing assistance to the police in maintaining law and order. Rangers is an umbrella term for:
 the Punjab Rangers, headquartered in Lahore, responsible for guarding Punjab Province's 1,300 km long border with India;
 the Sindh Rangers, headquartered in Karachi, defending Sindh Province's ~912 km long border with India.
 The Frontier Corps are four western provincial forces, part of the Civil Armed Forces. They operate along the external borders of the western provinces of Balochistan and Khyber Pakhtunkhwa and are the direct counterparts to the Rangers of the eastern provinces (Sindh and Punjab). The Frontier Corps comprises four separate organisations:
 Frontier Corps Khyber Pakhtunkhwa (North) and Frontier Corps Khyber Pakhtunkhwa (South) stationed in Khyber Pakhtunkhwa province;
 Frontier Corps Balochistan (North) and Frontier Corps Balochistan (South) stationed in Balochistan province.
Each force is headed by a seconded inspector general, who is a Pakistan Army officer of at least major-general rank, although the force itself is under the jurisdiction of the Interior Ministry. With a total manpower of approximately 80,000, the task of the Frontier Corps is to help local law enforcement in the maintenance of law and order, and to carry out border patrol and anti-smuggling operations. Some of the FC's constituent units such as the Chitral Scouts, the Khyber Rifles, Swat Levies, the Kurram Militia, the Tochi Scouts, the South Waziristan Scouts, and the Zhob Militia have regimental histories dating back to British colonial times and many, e.g. the Khyber Rifles, have distinguished combat records before and after 1947.
 The Gilgit−Baltistan Scouts are part of the Civil Armed Forces, under the direct control of the Ministry of the Interior of the Government of Pakistan. The Scouts are an internal and border security force with the prime objective to protect the China–Pakistan border and support Civil Administration in ensuring maintenance of law and order in Gilgit-Baltistan and anywhere else in Pakistan. The force was formerly known as the Northern Areas Scouts but was renamed to the Gilgit−Baltistan Scouts in 2011.
 The Maritime Security Agency is responsible for guarding the southern maritime border.
 Pakistan Customs is responsible for customs-related border security measures.

Schengen Area
Border control in the Schengen Area is primarily performed by the national authorities of individual member states. Consequently, there are many distinct organisations involved with border control along the area's external frontiers and at sea and air ports of entry within its members states.
  European Border and Coast Guard Agency (Frontex): Frontex is the Schengen Area's multilateral border control organisation. It is headquartered in Warsaw and operates in coordination with the border and coast guards of individual Schengen Area member states. According to the European Council on Refugees and Exiles (ECRE) and the British Refugee Council, in written evidence submitted to the UK House of Lords inquiry, Frontex fails to demonstrate adequate consideration of international and European asylum and human rights law including the 1951 Convention relating to the Status of Refugees and EU law in respect of access to asylum and the prohibition of refoulement. In September 2009, a Turkish military radar issued a warning to a Latvian helicopter conducting an anti-migrant and anti-refugee patrol in the eastern Aegean Sea to leave the area as it is in Turkish airspace. The Turkish General Staff reported that the Latvian Frontex aircraft had violated Turkish airspace west of Didim. According to a Hellenic Air Force announcement, the incident occurred as the Frontex helicopter —identified as an Italian-made Agusta A109— was patrolling a common route used by people smugglers near the small isle of Farmakonisi. Another incident took place in October 2009 in the airspace above the eastern Aegean sea, off the island of Lesbos. On 20 November 2009, the Turkish General Staff issued a press note alleging that an Estonian Border Guard aircraft Let L-410 UVP taking off from Kos on a Frontex mission had violated Turkish airspace west of Söke. As part of the Border and Coast Guard a Return Office was established with the capacity to repatriate immigrants residing illegally in the union by deploying Return Intervention Teams composed of escorts, monitors, and specialists dealing with related technical aspects. For this repatriation, a uniform European travel document would ensure wider acceptance by third countries. In emergency situations such Intervention Teams will be sent to problem areas to bolster security, either at the request of a member state or at the agency's own initiative. It is this latter proposed capability, to be able to deploy specialists to member states borders without the approval of the national government in question that is proving the most controversial aspect of this European Commission plan.
  Direction centrale de la police aux frontières: The Direction centrale de la police aux frontières (DCPF) is a directorate of the French National Police that is responsible for border control at certain border crossing points and border surveillance in some areas in France. They work alongside their British counterparts at Calais, and along the Channel Tunnel Rail Link with the British Transport Police. The DCPF is consequently largely responsible for Schengen Area border controls with the United Kingdom.
  Direction générale des douanes et droits indirects: Direction générale des douanes et droits indirects (DGDDI), commonly known as les douanes, is a French law enforcement agency responsible for levying indirect taxes, preventing smuggling, surveilling borders and investigating counterfeit money. The agency acts as a coast guard, border guard, sea rescue organisation and a customs service. In addition, since 1995, the agency has replaced the Border Police in carrying out immigration control at smaller border checkpoints, in particular at maritime borders and regional airports.
  Finnish Border Guard: The Finnish Border Guard, including the coast guard, is the agency responsible for border control related to persons, including passport control and border patrol. The Border Guard is a paramilitary organisation, subordinate to the Ministry of the Interior in administrative issues and to the President of the Republic in issues pertaining to the president's authority as Commander-in-Chief (e.g. officer promotions). The Finland-Russia border is a controlled external border of the Schengen Area, routinely patrolled and protected by a border zone enforced by the Border Guard. Finland's borders with Norway and Sweden are internal Schengen borders with no routine border controls, but the Border Guard maintains personnel in the area owing to its search and rescue (SAR) duties. There are two coast guard districts for patrolling maritime borders. In peacetime, the Border Guard trains special forces and light infantry and can be incorporated fully or in part into the Finnish Defence Forces when required by defence readiness. The Border Guard has police and investigative powers in immigration matters and can independently investigate immigration violations. The Border Guard has search and rescue (SAR) duties, both maritime and inland. The Guard operates SAR helicopters that are often used in inland SAR, in assistance of a local fire and rescue department or other authorities. The Border Guard shares border control duties with Finnish Customs, which inspects arriving goods, and the Finnish Police, which enforces immigration decisions such as removal.
  Koninklijke Marechaussee: The Koninklijke Marechaussee (English: Royal Military Constabulary) is a branch of the Dutch Armed Forces and are responsible for border control functions as well as guarding national borders and ports of entry, notably Amsterdam Schiphol Airport and Eurostar terminals at Amsterdam Centraal and Rotterdam Centraal. At Schiphol Airport, the Koninklijke Marechaussee operates a criminal investigations department and combats drugs trafficking in cooperation with FIOD for both passenger and air freight.
  Swedish border police: Border control duties in Sweden are handled by a special group in the police force. Sweden has natural land borders only to Norway and Finland, where there are no border controls, so border surveillance is not done there apart from customs control. Therefore, border control is focused on some fixed control points, during the border control-less Schengen period until 2015 mainly airports. The introduction of full border control from Denmark and the continent in 2015 put a heavy load on the border police who had to check 8000 cars and 50 trains per day coming over the Öresund Bridge, and 3000 cars in Helsingborg and more in other ferry ports. The police quickly educated several hundred semi-authorised border control guards who had to ask the real officers to take over any doubtful case. The customs office and the coast guard can not do formal border controls, but can stop people in doubtful cases and ask police to take over.

Singapore
The Immigration and Checkpoints Authority, or ICA, is the border control agency of Singapore under the Ministry of Home Affairs.
The ICA is responsible for border control, border customs services, and immigration enforcement in Singapore. ICA is accountable to Parliament through the Minister for Home Affairs. The agency is in charge of maintaining all border checkpoints in Singapore. In addition, ICA handles anti-terrorism operations and is responsible for many visa and residence related aspects of border control.

South Korea
Korea Immigration Service, is a part of Ministry of Justice, responsible for protecting border control Enforcement. Korea Immigration Service issues Visa, controls traffic of Human at Port of entry and Immigration

Korea Customs Service, is a part of Ministry of Economy and Finance, responsible for enforce Customs such as Tariff and movement of goods at Port of entry

South Africa
The Joint Operations Division is a component of the South African National Defence Force that patrols the land borders and oceanic territory. The National Border Control Unit of the South African Police Service works in ports and airports. Since 2020, The Border Management Agency (BMA), a branch of the Department of Home Affairs overseas border controls at ports and airports.

Taiwan
In areas controlled by the Republic of China, the National Immigration Agency (NIA), a subsidiary organisation of the Ministry of the Interior, is responsible for border control. The agency is headed by the Director General. The current Director-General is Chiu Feng-kuang. The agency was established in early 2007 and its job includes the care and guidance of new immigrants, exit and entry control, the deportation of undocumented migrants, and the prevention of human trafficking. The agency also deals with persons from Mainland China, Hong Kong and Macau who do not hold household registration in the areas controlled by the ROC.

United Kingdom
 HM Revenue and Customs: Customs administration related to border controls in the United Kingdom largely fall within the jurisdiction of HM Revenue and Customs.
 UK Visas and Immigration (UKVI): UKVI operates the visa aspect of the United Kingdom's border controls, managing applications from foreign nationals seeking to visit or work in the UK, and also considers applications from businesses and educational institutions seeking to become sponsors for foreign nationals. It also considers applications from foreign nationals seeking British citizenship.
 Border Force: The Border Force is in charge of physical controls and checkpoints at airports, land borders, and ports. Since 1 March 2012, Border Force has been a law-enforcement command within the Home Office, accountable directly to ministers. Border Force is responsible for immigration and customs at 140 rail, air and sea ports in the UK and western Europe, as well as thousands of smaller airstrips, ports and marinas. The work of the Border Force is monitored by the Independent Chief Inspector of Borders and Immigration.
 Immigration Enforcement: Immigration Enforcement is the organisation responsible for enforcing border control policies within the United Kingdom, including pursuing and removing undocumented migrants.

United States
Most aspects of American border control are handled by various divisions of the Department of Homelend Security (DHS).
 US Customs and Border Protection: U.S. Customs and Border Protection (CBP), a division of the DHS, is the country's primary border control organisation, charged with regulating and facilitating international trade, collecting import duties, and enforcing American trade, customs and immigration regulations. It has a workforce of more than 58000 employees. Every individual entering America is subject to inspection by Customs and Border Protection (CBP) officers for compliance with immigration, customs and agriculture regulations. Travellers are screened for a variety of prohibited items ranging from gold, silver, and precious metals to alcoholic beverages, firearms, and narcotics.
 Transport Security Administration: The Transport Security Administration, or TSA, is a division of the DHS responsible for conducting security checks at American airports and other transport hubs, including overseas preclearance facilities (with the notable exception of those in Canada, where CATSA conducts security checks prior to CBP immigration screening). For passengers departing by air from America, TSA screening is the only physical check conducted upon departure.
 Immigration and Customs Enforcement: Immigration and Customs Enforcement, or ICE, is the organisation responsible for enforcing immigration laws within America, focusing largely on deporting undocumented migrants. ICE operates detention centres throughout the country and approximately 34,000 undocumented migrants are imprisoned by ICE on any given day, in over 500 detention centres, jails, and prisons nationwide.
 United States Citizenship and Immigration Services: United States Citizenship and Immigration Services is responsible for various aspects of border control relating to immigration, including reviewing visa petitions and applications as well as processing asylum claims.
 State and local law enforcement agencies: Officers from police forces established by state, county, and municipal governments across America are deputised by ICE to detain undocumented migrants pursuant to Immigration and Nationality Act Section 287(g). Under section 287(g), ICE trains and authorises state and local law enforcement officers to identify, process, and detain undocumented migrants they encounter during their daily law-enforcement activity. The 287(g) programme has been criticised for increasing racist profiling by police and undermining community safety as the fear of deportation discourages undocumented migrants from reporting crimes or talking to law enforcement officers.

Notes

References

Control
Export and import control
Control list
International law
Travel
Visas